Strontium oxalate is a compound with the chemical formula SrC2O4. Strontium oxalate can exist either in a hydrated form (SrC2O4•H2O) or as the acidic salt of strontium oxalate (SrC2O4•H2C2O4•H2O).

Use in pyrotechnics
With the addition of heat, strontium oxalate will decompose based on the following reaction:

 SrC2O4 → SrO + CO2 + CO

Strontium oxalate is a good agent for use in pyrotechnics since it decomposes readily with the addition of heat. When it decomposes into strontium oxide, it will produce a red color. Since this reaction produces carbon monoxide, which can undergo a further reduction with magnesium oxide, strontium oxalate is an excellent red color producing agent in the presence of magnesium. If it is not in the presence of magnesium, strontium carbonate has been found to be a better option to produce an even greater effect.

References

Strontium compounds
Oxalates
Inorganic compounds